Yiyang Subdistrict is a subdistrict and the seat of Changning City in Hunan, China. It was one of 4 subdistricts approved to establish in 2008. The subdistrict of Yiyang has 47 villages and 4 communities under its jurisdiction, its seat is at Huangqiao Village.

History
The subdistrict of Yiyang was approved to form　from 5 villages of Wanshou, Songtang, Songlian, Shizhou and Donghu, 4 communities of Chengdong, Chengbei, Qunying and Qingyi of the former Yiyang Town in 2008, it was officially established in November 2008. On November 9, 2015, the township of Yitan was merged to the subdistrict.

Subdivisions
In 2015, Yiyang Township and the former Yiyang Subdistrict were merged to establish Yiyang Subdistrict. The newly established Yiyang Subdistrict has 47 villages and 4 communities.

47 villages
 Bajiaotang Village
 Caotang Village
 Caotong Tongcun
 Changtong Village
 Chayuan Village
 Chuanshan Village
 Cuijiayu Village
 Daqiao Village
 Dawu Tsuen
 Dayan Village
 Donghu Village
 Dongjia Jiacun
 Fengping Village
 Fushou Village
 Heping Village
 Huangqiao Village
 Huijiang Village
 Huzhou Village
 Jiangshui Village
 Jintang Village
 Lianping Village
 Liufu Village
 Meitang Village
 Mengshan Village
 Nanjing Village
 Qunying Village
 Shaling Village
 Shangdong Village
 Shangyi Village
 Shiqiao Village
 Shizhou Village
 Shuquan Village
 Songlian Village
 Songtong Village
 Tongwan Village
 Wanshou Village
 Wulian Village
 Xingziping Village
 Xinhe Village
 Xinhua Village
 Xinjian Village
 Xinlian Village
 Yelan Village
 Youshi Village
 Zhongyi Village
 Zhutang Village
 Ziyang Village

4 communities
 Chengdong Community
 Chengbei Community
 Qunying Community
 Changyi Community

References

External links
 Official website

Changning, Hunan
Subdistricts of Hunan